Paul Nowak may refer to:

Paul Nowak (basketball) (1914–1983), American basketball player
Paul Nowak (trade unionist) (born 1972), British trade union official
Paul Nowak, Iron Cross recipient, see List of Knight's Cross of the Iron Cross recipients (N)